Robert Hargrove may refer to:

 Robert Kennon Hargrove (1829–1905), American bishop of the Methodist Episcopal Church, South
 Robert Jefferson Hargrove Jr. (1934–2005), bishop of the Episcopal Diocese of Western Louisiana